Bruno Alexandre Dias Coelho  (born 1 August 1987) is a Portuguese futsal player who plays as a winger for FF Napoli for the Portugal national team. Coelho scored Portugal's winning goal in UEFA Futsal Euro 2018 final. He also has over 100 caps.

Honours

Club
Benfica
Campeonato Nacional: 2011-12, 2014–15, 2018–19
Taça de Portugal: 2011-12, 2014–15 2018-19
Taça da Liga: 2017–18, 2018–19, 2019–20
Supertaça de Portugal: 2011, 2012, 2015, 2016

ACCS Asnières Villeneuve 92
Championnat de France de Futsal: 2020-2021

International
UEFA Futsal Championship: 2018, 2022
FIFA Futsal World Cup: 2021
Individual
UEFA Futsal Euro 2018 Silver Shoe

Orders
  Commander of the Order of Prince Henry
  Commander of the Order of Merit

References

External links
 

1987 births
Living people
People from Sintra
Futsal forwards
Portuguese men's futsal players
S.L. Benfica futsal players
Sportspeople from Lisbon District